Juri Quta may refer to:

 Juri Quta (Batallas), a lake in Bolivia
 Juri Quta (Pukarani), a lake in Bolivia
 Juri Quta, Los Andes, a lake in Bolivia